Iota Tucanae (ι Tuc, ι Tucanae) is a solitary star in the southern constellation of Tucana. Based upon an annual parallax shift of 10.72 mas as seen from Earth, it is located around 304 light years from the Sun. With an apparent visual magnitude of +5.33, it is faintly visible to the naked eye.

This is a yellow-hued G-type giant star with a stellar classification of G5 III. It is classified as a semiregular variable star, showing a periodicity of 66.8 days with an amplitude of 0.0202 in visual magnitude. It has an estimated 2.2 times the mass of the Sun, and, at the age of 1.69 billion years, it has evolved away from the main sequence, expanding to 11 times the Sun's radius. The star radiates 65 times the solar luminosity from its photosphere at an effective temperature of 5,039 K.

References

G-type giants
Semiregular variable stars
Tucanae, Iota
Tucana (constellation)
Durchmusterung objects
006793
005268
0332